php[architect] is a magazine dedicated to PHP programming language. It was founded in 2002  by Marco Tabini and his group The BlueParabola. php[architect] began as a printed magazine, but went digital-only in 2009 due to the high cost of print media. The magazine is headquartered in San Diego, CA. In December 2012, the magazine was acquired by musketeers.me, LLC, and later that year returned to print publication using a print-on-demand system. In October 2021, the magazine was acquired again by the owners of the DiegoDev Group, LLC, Eric Van Johnson and John Congdon. They decided to establish PHP Architect as its own LLC and established PHP Architect, LLC. The company also runs online training courses and conferences and has published numerous manuals and textbooks on PHP programming.

Books

References

External links
 Official website

2002 establishments in Virginia
2009 disestablishments in Virginia
Monthly magazines published in the United States
Online magazines published in the United States
Science and technology magazines published in the United States
Defunct computer magazines published in the United States
Magazines established in 2002
Magazines disestablished in 2009
Magazines published in Virginia
Online magazines with defunct print editions